Mogtédo  is a department or commune of Ganzourgou Province in central-eastern Burkina Faso. Its capital lies at the town of Mogtédo. According to the 2006 general population census, actualized in 2012 for the municipal elections, the department has a total population of 44,668.

Towns and villages

 Mogtédo	(15 076 inhabitants) (capital)
 Bomboré	(8 657 inhabitants)
 Gadghin	(301 inhabitants)
 Nobsin	(1 998 inhabitants)
 Rapadama	(12 647 inhabitants)
 Toéssin	(1 498 inhabitants)

References

Departments of Burkina Faso
Ganzourgou Province